The 1948–49 Wyoming Cowboys basketball team represented the University of Wyoming in NCAA men's competition in the 1948–49 season. The Cowboys qualified for the 1949 NCAA Tournament.

NCAA basketball tournament
West
Oklahoma A&M 40, Wyoming 39

Team Players in the NBA
The following were selected in the 1949 BAA Draft.

References

Wyoming Cowboys basketball seasons
Wyoming
Wyoming Cowboys men's basketball
Wyoming Cowboys men's basketball